In the state governments of the United States, all 50 states have the executive position of agriculture commissioner, director of agriculture, or secretary of agriculture. This official is in charge of the state's agriculture department. The agriculture commissioners are organized at the national level by the National Association of State Departments of Agriculture.

The agriculture commissioner is elected in 12 states: Alabama, Florida, Georgia, Iowa, Kentucky, Louisiana, Mississippi, North Carolina, North Dakota, South Carolina, and Texas. The powers and duties of the office vary from state to state, but are often substantial: in about 40 states, agriculture departments regulate the animal industry, and in roughly half the states, agriculture departments regulate food safety and meat inspection. In some states, the agriculture commissioner has more power. For example, in Florida the agriculture commissioner is one of three members of the Florida Cabinet (along with the governor and attorney general), giving the commissioner some influence over state policy beyond agriculture. In North Dakota, the agriculture commissioner sits on a number of important boards, such as the North Dakota Industrial Commission (which oversees the state-owned North Dakota Mill and Elevator and Bank of North Dakota).

Departments

References